William Holmes Wood (September 6, 1900 – June 7, 1988) was an American football, basketball, and baseball player, coach of football, and United States Army officer.  He served as the head football coach at the United States Military Academy from 1938 to 1940, compiling a record of 12–13–3.

Biography

Wood was born in Waterbury, Connecticut on September 6, 1900, and raised in Baltimore, Maryland. After graduating from Baltimore Polytechnic Institute, he attended Johns Hopkins University, before transferring to the United States Military Academy at West Point. There he lettered in three sports, and graduated in 1925.

He married Elizabeth Tuttle in Chicago on April 30, 1927.

Serving in China and Europe during World War II, Wood was chief of staff of the 13th Armored Division. His decorations included the Legion of Merit and the Bronze Star Medal. He retired from the Army in 1956 after rising to the rank of brigadier general.

Wood died at the age of 87 on June 7, 1988 at the William Hill Health Care Center in Easton, Maryland.  He had been stricken with Alzheimer's disease. He was buried at Arlington National Cemetery.

Head coaching record

References

1900 births
1988 deaths
American football fullbacks
American men's basketball players
Army Black Knights baseball players
Army Black Knights football coaches
Army Black Knights football players
Army Black Knights men's basketball players
United States Army generals
United States Army personnel of World War II
Johns Hopkins University alumni
Sportspeople from Waterbury, Connecticut
Coaches of American football from Maryland
Players of American football from Baltimore
Baseball players from Baltimore
Basketball players from Baltimore
Deaths from dementia in Maryland
Deaths from Alzheimer's disease
Recipients of the Legion of Merit
Baltimore Polytechnic Institute alumni
Burials at Arlington National Cemetery